Dotinurad (Urece) is a drug for the treatment of gout and hyperuricemia. It was developed by Fuji Yakuhin and approved for use in Japan in 2020.  The drug is continuing clinical trials by Fortress Biotech and regulatory evaluation for approval in North America and Europe.

Dotinurad acts as a selective urate reabsorption inhibitor that has uric acid lowering activity.

References 

Antigout agents
Phenols
Chlorobenzenes
Benzothiazoles